Joe Novak (born April 19, 1945) is a former American football player and coach. He served as the head football coach at Northern Illinois University from 1996 to 2007, compiling a record of 63–76.

Novak played college football as a defensive end at Miami University under head coach Bo Schembechler.  After beginning his coaching career in the high school ranks, Novak had stints as an assistant coach at Miami, the University of Illinois, Northern Illinois, and Indiana University.  At Illinois, he served under head coach Gary Moeller, who had been one of the assistants at Miami under Schembechler.  Novak was a longtime assistant of Bill Mallory, another Miami assistant coach and alum.  Novak served on Mallory's staffs from 1980-1995.

During the 2003 season, Novak's Northern Illinois squad defeated three BCS conference teams: #13 Maryland, #21 Alabama in Tuscaloosa, and Iowa State.  Winning their first seven games, the Huskies were ranked as high as #12 in the AP Poll, #14 in the Coaches' Poll, and #10 in the BCS rankings.  In the 2004 season, Novak led the Huskies to a 9–3 record and their first bowl appearance in 21 years, winning the Silicon Valley Football Classic over Troy.

On November 26, 2007, Novak announced his retirement from coaching.  "Winning is fragile," Novak said, "You've got to enjoy it when you're doing it....People have always said, 'You'll know when it's time,' and I believe that now is the time."  His successor at Northern Illinois was Jerry Kill.

Head coaching record

College

References

1945 births
Living people
American football defensive linemen
Indiana Hoosiers football coaches
Illinois Fighting Illini football coaches
Miami RedHawks football coaches
Miami RedHawks football players
Northern Illinois Huskies football coaches
High school football coaches in Ohio